Taylor Black (née Gildersleeve) is an American actress, Columbia University graduate, producer and model. She is known for her first major role as Sydney Harris in the ABC daytime drama All My Children, and as the former Miss New York Teen USA. She is professionally known as Taylor Black and is the co-owner of Black Tandem, a multidisciplinary creative company based in Los Angeles.

Career

2005–2012
In 2005, she auditioned for the role of Colby Chandler in All My Children and was offered the role of the teenager Sydney Harris. Her character's story spanned 38 episodes and ended in June 2007. After leaving All My Children, Black joined the cast of One Life to Live as the character Leah Valeria. While in high school, Black appeared in a series of commercials, films and television shows including that of guest stars Lauren Claiborne on NBC's Law and Order, and Archeria in 30 Rock. In 2009, she won the pageantry title of Miss New York Teen USA and went on to compete in the Miss Teen USA pageant. After graduating from Mattituck High School, Taylor attended Columbia University and graduated with a degree in film studies, concentrating in production.

2012–2015: Film and television
Black's film and television career continued during and after college. In 2010, she had leading roles as Clare Shanley in the Alloy TV/Teen Networks series Haute & Bothered and recurred as Tiffany  in The CW's Gossip Girl. Co-starring roles included the role of Kelly in the CBS series Blue Bloods, Gabi in CBS Person of Interest and Sasha in the CBS drama from the executive producer Robert De Niro, NYC22. She also appeared in several episodes of Late Night with Jimmy Fallon as Fallon’s "assistant", was a judge on the panel of Reel Teens 2010, and as Blake, the lead of Lorne Michaels' Cool Kid’s Table (Above Average Productions), where she hosted and spoofed celebrities. Other work included the film Ass Backwards which was premiered at Sundance in 2013, nine episodes recurring in MTV's sketch comedy series Hey Girl, Anna McGraw in the CBS series Unforgettable, Beth in the film Affluenza, Kippy Cook in The CW's Cheerleader Death Squad, and Laura Gorman in MTV’s One Bad Choice. In 2014, Taylor starred opposite the Emmy Award actor Peter Strauss in Lifetime's film Sugar Daddies. She had the supporting role of Kristin in the film ADDicted. In 2016, she guest starred as Laura Mahoney in David Schwimmer's AMC series, Feed the Beast and Jane in the Hulu series Deadbeat.

2015–present: Black Tandem and mainstream projects
In 2015, Black married the artist Bradley Livingstone Black. Their production company, Black Tandem, operates from Los Angeles. Their film Helen of Troy (2017) was filmed on location in Paris, France, and in Upstate New York. It enjoyed a successful festival run highlighted by its international premiere at the Academy Award eligible Bermuda International Film Festival in 2018, and ended in the United States at the TCL Chinese Theater in Hollywood as part of the HollyShorts Film Festival in 2019. They pair are currently working on a screenplay adaptation of a book they optioned titled Caveat Emptor. The project was formerly optioned by Ron Howard with Ryan Gosling attached as the lead.

Beginning in 2017, Taylor Black became the face of the Swiss jewelry line, Nana Fink. She continues to work in leading film and television roles including guest stars Lauren Barret in CBS's Criminal Minds: Beyond Borders, Gina in NBC's Midnight Texas and Misty Canyons in the Fox series Lucifer. Black also appeared in Woody Allen's  film A Rainy Day in New York as well as the film, The Big Take. In 2019, she had recurring roles of Ashley Cunningham in The CW's Dynasty and Emma Mitchell on Sony/Spectrum's LA's Finest opposite Gabrielle Union and Jessica Alba. Black was cast as Susie Steiner, a supporting lead opposite Samuel L. Jackson, Nicholas Hoult and Anthony Mackie in Apple TV+'s The Banker.

Philanthropy
Black's charitable work has included the Make a Wish Foundation, Teens Against Cancer and volunteering for Cardinal McCloskey Services. Recently, Tayor has begun working with the Children's Hospital L.A. and is a patron of Ganna Walksa Lotusland botanical gardens in Montecito, California.

Filmography

Film

Television

As a producer

Awards and nominations

References

External links
 
 
 Black Tandem website
 

Living people
American film actresses
American television actresses
21st-century American actresses
American film producers
Year of birth missing (living people)